Shiklah is a fictional character that appears in American comic books published by Marvel Comics. She was married to Deadpool, but they've recently become estranged, and she married Dracula instead.

Publication history
The character first appeared in the web comic Deadpool: The Gauntlet #3, created by writers  Brian Posehn and Gerry Duggan and artist Reilly Brown.

Fictional character biography
Before humans came to be, Shiklah and her family ruled over the monster world. Vampires sought to overthrow them by starting a war that lasted over a century, which also saw the coming of man. After their family was overwhelmed and their kingdom had fallen, Shiklah's father was distraught over the seeming deaths of his sons and decided to seal her away in a coffin until the war ran its course, or until she was to be wed. Deadpool was hired by Dracula to bring Shiklah to him so he could marry her, in order to take over her old lands and unite the monster world under his rule and end a long feud. After traveling to the Arabian Peninsula, Deadpool timely rescued Shiklah (sealed in a coffin) before a faction of teleporting vampires managed to destroy it. Deadpool brought the coffin to Greece and got into a fight with the Minotaur, where the coffin shattered and Shiklah was awakened along with her pet, Bug.

Shiklah repaid Deadpool's service by attempting to absorb his life-force by kissing him, but failed due to Deadpool's healing factor. Shiklah then followed Deadpool out of Greece by hopping a train to Paris and they were intercepted by Blade, who was trying to convince Deadpool that Shiklah was a monster and that Deadpool should give her up. They fought and Shiklah (in her monster form) helped Deadpool to defeat Blade, as they had grown close.

After Deadpool arranged transportation by calling his friend Bob, the pair decided to see Paris and visited the Catacombs. After Shiklah saved Deadpool from being possessed by a templar ghost, she admitted to having feelings for him. Deadpool pushed away her advances due to his worry that things would turn disastrous just like all of his past relationships.

After leaving the Catacombs, the pair was captured by Hydra, who wanted to exploit Shiklah's power. They escaped but the Hydra vessel was intercepted by A.I.M. Shiklah proved herself by fighting and defeating the A.I.M. agents and a large robot, but she was captured by MODOK. Deadpool then defeated MODOK and saved Shiklah from being abducted by A.I.M.

Once Shiklah and Deadpool returned to New York City, they got married in a ceremony officiated by Nightcrawler. They then gathered her army and Deadpool's allies and fought an all-out war with Dracula's forces, eventually driving him from Monsteropolis and leaving Shiklah in charge. Deadpool then takes his new wife out on the town and shows her modern-day New York.

As part of the All-New, All-Different Marvel event, Shiklah was shown to have been treating Deadpool with a lot of disdain. While watching television in bed with Werewolf by Night and a gorgon, Shiklah told them that Deadpool is one of her husbands.

Deadpool believes his marriage is suffering due to working with the Avengers and other superheroes. This fits in with the plan of the villain working to disrupt every aspect of Deadpool's life. Later, the two are seen cuddling in bed and discussing pleasing romantic times. A bit later in the Spider-Man/Deadpool series, we see more deterioration of her marriage to Deadpool. She doesn't approve of the changes to his character since he started working with Spider-Man. She hates his new healed face and Deadpool burns it off for her, which she claims is a little better. He wishes for them to work things out, but Shiklah isn't happy that he's not the same man she married. She asks him when the last time he killed anyone was. She says she doesn't know him anymore and asks if he even knows himself. Deadpool says he's finally one of the good guys now and Shiklah leaves him yet again, telling him that good guys and demonic princesses don't do well together.

In the events called "The Last Days Of Magic", the former S.H.I.E.L.D. agent Michael sacrifices himself to save all of Shiklah's people from dimension-crossing magic destroyers.

'Til Death Do Us 
Her marriage to Deadpool hit the rocks harder when Deadpool discovered Shiklah in bed with Werewolf by Night. He shoots Werewolf by Night in the head, before he and Shiklah have a showdown, which goes from her Monster Kingdom to the streets of New York. Finally, things only get worse during the events of Til Death Do Us. One of Shiklah's subjects is killed, and neither the humans nor Deadpool seems to care. She is angry that Wade seems to be siding with the humans and declares war on the surface world to annex New York. Deadpool tries to call in help to stop Shiklah and a war breaks out between the two. During the war, Shiklah finally ends up marrying Dracula, who proposes to her. Deadpool isn't happy, since the entire reason they got married was because he was protecting her from Dracula, but Shiklah doesn't care to hear it. Toward the end of the war, she and Deadpool sleep together one last time, then have a heart-to-heart, ending things on a slightly more positive note. She kisses Wade, draining him, before telling him good-bye while he's temporarily unconscious. When Wade awakens again, he finds that Shiklah has written him a letter and has gone away with Dracula. Her monsters no longer want her as a ruler, which she accepts, not wanting to force her rule on them. She admits to loving them and Deadpool enough to leave them and avoid their suffering due to her presence. She tells him that she rushed into their marriage and being ruler and wishes him well. However, she tells him to keep his phone on because he'd "never know when booty calls."

Powers and abilities
Shiklah possesses shape-shifting abilities, superhuman strength and speed, and enhanced agility, reflexes and endurance. Shiklah also has the ability to project regular and ethereal flame, as well as mind control. She can see through her familiar's eyes and open dimensional portals. Most people, including immortal vampires, are instantly drained of all life force when she kisses them. She can also devour multiple souls at once in a scene Bob from Hydra described as similar to "Raiders of the Lost Ark". She is essentially immortal, if not indestructible, and has centuries of knowledge which did not prepare her for the horror that is Twilight.

Shiklah's true form is of a giant purple demon which is physically much stronger than her human form.

She can also smell when Deadpool has an out of body experience and makes out with Death.

Shiklah describes herself as "undead", not just demonic, implying that she may have died and been brought back.

She has a vast army of extremely loyal monsters at her command.

Alternate versions

Deadpool 2099
In the year 2099, Shiklah and Deadpool's biological daughter, Warda, is seen. She kidnaps Deadpool, believing he knows the fate of Shiklah.

Deadpool & Cable: Split Second
A 25-year-older version of Shiklah has been operating in a world plagued with temporal anomalies, thanks to a mission that Deadpool and Cable are on. When the duo show up in her territory, she assists them with intelligence in the hope that said anomalies will leave and twenty-five years without her husband will not come to pass.

Secret Wars (2015)

During the "Secret Wars" storyline, a variation of Shiklah lives in a variation of Monster Metropolis, which is located beneath the surface of the Battleworld domain known as the Kingdom of Manhattan.

References

External links

Shiklah at Marvel Wiki
Shiklah at Comic Vine

Comics characters introduced in 2014
Fictional characters with fire or heat abilities
Fictional queens
Fictional succubi
Marvel Comics characters who are shapeshifters
Marvel Comics characters who can move at superhuman speeds
Marvel Comics characters with superhuman strength
Marvel Comics telepaths
Marvel Comics female characters